Grace was a station on the Chicago Transit Authority's Howard Line, which is now part of the Red Line. The station was located at Grace Street and Sheffield Avenue in the Lakeview neighborhood of Chicago. Grace was situated north of Addison and south of Sheridan. Grace opened on June 7, 1900, and closed on August 1, 1949, along with 23 other stations as part of a CTA service revision.

References

Defunct Chicago "L" stations
Railway stations in the United States opened in 1900
Railway stations closed in 1949
1900 establishments in Illinois
1949 disestablishments in Illinois